The Lacy Dog or Blue Lacy Dog is a breed of working dog that originated in the State of Texas in the mid-19th century. The Lacy was first recognized in 2001 by the Texas Senate. In Senate Resolution No. 436, the 77th Legislature honored the Lacy as "a true Texas breed." In 2005, in House Concurrent Resolution No. 108, the 79th Legislature called the Lacy "a Texas original; the only dog breed to have originated in this state." In June 2005, Governor Rick Perry signed the legislation adopting the Blue Lacy as "the official State Dog Breed of Texas". As expected, the vast majority of Lacy dogs are found in Texas. However, as the breed becomes more recognized, breeding populations are being established across the United States, Canada, and most recently in Europe.

Description

Appearance
Lacy dogs are strong and fast, lightly built but proportional within the height-to-weight ratio.

Color
Though they are often called "blue" Lacys, there are three permissible color varieties of the Lacy. "Blues" are any shade of gray from light silver to dark charcoal. "Reds" range from light cream to rust. The "Tri" combines a blue base with distinct red markings as appropriate for trim, and white which may appear on the brisket and stretch from chin to groin. White may also be present on one or more paws. Excessive white is discouraged, and markings on the face or above mid-line are a disqualifying fault. Their eyes are sharp and alert, ranging in color from bright yellow to rich amber.

Coat
The coat should be short, smooth and tight. An excessively long or rough coat is a disqualification. Lacys shed, but require minimal grooming.

Temperament
 
Blue Lacy Dogs are intelligent, intense, active, and alert. Developed to be both hunting and herding dogs, they display great drive and determination to work with big game and control difficult livestock. Young dogs may have too much energy and drive for small children. They are easy to train, learning new skills quickly.

Activities
The Lacy is a working breed, and does much better when given a job, which allows them to burn off excessive energy. Work they excel at includes herding livestock, blood trailing or tracking, treeing game, running trap lines, and hunting wild hogs. 
Modern activities like agility that stress intelligence, passion, speed and nimbleness may be appropriate substitutes for traditional work. Herding instincts and trainability can be measured at noncompetitive herding tests. Lacys generally exhibit herding instincts and can be trained to compete in stock dog trials or hog bays. During recent years, Lacy dogs have also become recognized for their tracking skills, and are used to locate "lost" game animals. They are also used by United States trappers for save and chasing operations.

Health
Lacys are generally healthy dogs. Developed for generations to meet the requirements of ranchers and hunters, they are sturdy enough to withstand tough terrain, difficult working conditions, and both hot and cold weather by Texan standards. However, skin problems and food allergies can occur. Color dilution alopecia is very rare but has occurred in Lacys.

History

The Lacy dog was named after the Lacy brothers (Young Ewin "Ewin", Francis Marion "Frank", John Hiram "Harry," and George Lacy) who created the breed for work on their ranch, the Lacy Lans Ranch (as of 2022, a portion of the original ranch is still owned by descendants of the Lacy family but is now called the Shifflett Ranch).  The Lacy family had moved from Kentucky to Texas in 1858, settling in Burnet County, Texas. The Blue Lacy dog was allegedly a mixture of Greyhound, an unnamed scent hound, and either coyote or gray wolf. Historical and geographical evidence points to the July Hound as the possible scent hound genetic factor, but there is no official documentation asserting this claim. They were bred to handle multiple tasks on the ranch, but especially the herding of free-range hogs (leading to the affectionate local sobriquet "Lacy hog dogs"). Texas House Concurrent Resolution No. 108 also mentions that scenthound may have been included in the breed's mix. The Lacy family who bred the Blue Lacy dog was the same family who donated the red (also known as pink) granite from their quarry on Granite Mountain (which was then located on the Lacy Lans Ranch and owned by the Lacy brother George, along with his business partners William H. Westfall and Nimrod L. Norton) to build the Texas State Capitol building in Austin, Texas.

On March 15, 2005, in the 79th Legislature of the State of Texas, Representative Joaquin Castro, at the request of the Texas Lacy Game Dog Association, filed House Concurrent Resolution No. 108, proposing the blue Lacy as the State Dog of Texas. This legislation was proposed to recognize the original breeders, the Lacy family, and their contribution to the State of Texas as well as to honor the Lacy Dog as a Texas original. House Concurrent Resolution No. 108  was adopted by the Texas House of Representatives on May 15, 2005, and by the Senate ten days later on May 25, 2005. Governor Rick Perry signed the legislation adopting the Lacy as "the official State Dog Breed of Texas" on June 18, 2005.

The Lacy was proposed by some in 2008 to replace Reveille VII, a collie, as the mascot dog of Texas A&M. In accordance with tradition since Reveille III, however, a collie was chosen.

See also
 Dogs portal
 List of dog breeds

References

External links

   

Scent hounds
Herding dogs
Dog breeds originating in the United States
Rare dog breeds